20th New York Film Critics Circle Awards
unknown(announced December 28, 1954)

On the Waterfront
The 20th New York Film Critics Circle Awards, honored the best filmmaking of 1954.

Winners
Best Film:
On the Waterfront
Best Actor:
Marlon Brando - On the Waterfront
Best Actress:
Grace Kelly - The Country Girl, Rear Window and Dial M for Murder
Best Director:
Elia Kazan - On the Waterfront
Best Foreign Language Film:
Gate of Hell (Jigokumon) • Japan

References

External links
1954 Awards

1954
New York Film Critics Circle Awards, 1954
New York Film Critics Circle Awards
New York Film Critics Circle Awards
New York Film Critics Circle Awards